The Best of Wham!: If You Were There... is the second UK-released compilation to summarise the career of British pop duo Wham!. It was released in 1997, and peaked at number 4 on the UK Albums Chart. The end of the album features a hidden track that was first heard on their debut album, Fantastic.

Track listing

Notes
 "Everything She Wants '97" is a remix of the original song
 "I'm Your Man '96" is a re-recording of the original song

Video
Released on VHS, VCD and DVD.
 "Wham Rap!" (Michael, Ridgeley) – 3:15
 "Club Tropicana" (Michael, Ridgeley) – 4:31
 "Wake Me Up Before You Go-Go" – 3:45
 "Last Christmas" – 4:20
 "The Edge of Heaven" – 4:25
 "Where Did Your Heart Go?" (Was, Was) – 5:10
 "I'm Your Man" – 5:40
 "Everything She Wants" – 6:30
 "Freedom" – 6:32

Charts

Weekly charts

Year-end charts

Certifications

References

Wham! albums
1997 greatest hits albums
Epic Records compilation albums